Jim Broadbent is an English actor known for his work in film and television.

Broadbent received his Academy Award for Best Supporting Actor for his performance in Richard Eyre's Iris (2001) starring alongside Dame Judi Dench. That same year he won his British Academy Film Award for his performance in Baz Luhrmann's Moulin Rouge! (2001). In 2007, he received a British Academy Television Award for his work in Tom Hooper's television film, Longford (2007). He has received two Golden Globe Awards for his performances in Iris (2001) and Longford (2007)

Major awards

Academy Awards

BAFTA Awards

Emmy Awards

Golden Globe Awards

Grammy Award

Screen Actors Guild Award

Critics awards

References

External links
 
Jim Broadbent | Culture | The Guardian
Jim Broadbent on the British Film Institute

Lists of awards received by British actor